Brentham Garden Suburb near Pitshanger in Ealing was the first garden suburb in London to be built in co-partnership housing movement principles, predating the larger and better-known Hampstead Garden Suburb by some years. It was mostly built between 1901 and 1915, and became a conservation area in 1969.

External links 
 Brentham Society

Areas of London
Districts of the London Borough of Ealing
Garden suburbs